Tommy Page is the debut self-titled studio album by American singer and songwriter Tommy Page, released in 1988 on Sire and Warner Bros. Records. The album contains Page's minor and early hits, such as "A Shoulder to Cry On" and "A Zillion Kisses".

Track listing
 "A Zillion Kisses" (Tommy Page, L. Russell Brown)
 "Turning Me On" (Page, Brown)
 "I Think I'm in Love" (Page)
 "Hard to Be Normal" (Page, Brown)
 "I Love London" (Page, Brown)
 "Making My Move" (Page, Brown)
 "Love Takes Over" (Page, Shelly Peiken)
 "A Shoulder to Cry On" (Page)
 "Minetta Lane" (Page, Brown)

Singles
Three singles and one promo single (four singles overall) were released from the album. The second single, "A Shoulder to Cry On", became Page's first hit, peaking at #29 on the US music chart. Another hit from the album, "A Zillion Kisses", reached #45 on the Billboard Dance Club Songs.

Personnel
Tommy Page - vocals
Art Labriola, Miguel Kertsman, Tommy Page - keyboards
Ira Siegal, Matthew Cang - guitars
Alan Park, Robbie Kondor - piano
Tony Levin - bass
Joe Mardin - drums
Bashiri Johnson - percussions
Gerald Ashbey, Phil Eastop - French horn
Jeffrey Smith - saxophone
Tommy Page, Shelly Peiken, Maria Adler - background vocals

Release history

References

1988 debut albums
Sire Records albums
Albums produced by Arif Mardin